Positive-incentive value is the anticipated pleasure involved in the performance of a particular behavior, such as eating a particular food or drinking a particular beverage. It is a key element of the positive-incentive theories of hunger.

See also
 Incentive

References

Motivation